Pultenaea subalpina, commonly known as rosy bush-pea, is a species of flowering plant in the family Fabaceae and is endemic to a restricted area of Victoria. It is a rigid, prostrate to erect or spreading shrub with linear leaves and pink, pea-like flowers.

Description
The flowers are pink and arranged in dense clusters of up to twelve with enlarged stipules at the base of the floral leaves.

Taxonomy
Rosy bush-pea was first formally described in 1855 by Ferdinand von Mueller who gave it the name Burtonia subalpina his book Definitions of rare or hitherto undescribed Australian plants. In 1917, George Claridge Druce changed the name to Pultenaea subalpina.

Distribution and habitat

References

subalpina
Fabales of Australia
Flora of Victoria (Australia)
Plants described in 1855
Taxa named by Ferdinand von Mueller